The 2011 Rose of Tralee was the 52nd edition of the annual Irish international festival, held on 22–23 August 2011 at the Festival Dome, in Tralee, County Kerry. Hosted by Dáithí Ó Sé for a second time, 32 contestants participated in the 2011 pageant. The festival was won by Tara Talbot, who represented Queensland. Talbot was hot favourite going into the festival. The background music for the event was composed by the Garda Síochána Orchestra.

List of Roses

Broadcasting
The 2011 Rose of Tralee was broadcast live on RTÉ One and attracted an audience share of 54.3 per cent, the highest in four years.

Trivia 
Perez Hilton posted a video clip online of Siobhéal Nic Eochaidh's on-stage grooving gangsta style to "LMFAO - Party Rock Anthem" in a black floor length gown. He commented: "What the hell is this?? We have no idea, but it's totally making our day!"

References

Rose of Tralee
Rose of Tralee